Lynne Hanley (born 1943) is an American feminist author and literary critic. She is Professor Emerita of literature and writing at Hampshire College.

Background
Hanley received a B.A. in English from Cornell University, an M.A. from Columbia University, and a Ph.D. from the University of California, Berkeley.  Before coming to Hampshire, she taught at Princeton University, Douglass College and Mount Holyoke College.

Publications

Select articles
"Sleeping with the Enemy: Doris Lessing in the Century of Destruction" in The Columbia History of the British Novel. Richetti, John (ed.); Bender, John (assoc. ed.); David, Deirdre (assoc. ed.); Seidel, Michael (assoc. ed.). New York: Columbia UP, 1994: 918-38
"To El Salvador" in Critical Responses in Arts and Letters, #8: The Critical Response to Joan Didion. Sharon Felton (ed.)  Westport: Greenwood Press, 1993.
"Mean Streak." Frontiers: A Journal of Women Studies, Vol. 14, No. 1, 1993: 93 -101.
"Writing Across the Color Bar: Apartheid and Desire."  In Massachusetts Review: A Quarterly of Literature, the Arts and Public Affairs, vol. 32, no. 4, pp. 495–506, Summer 1991
"Alias Jane Somers." Doris Lessing Newsletter, vol. 12, no. 1, pp. 5–6, 14, Spring 1988.

Books
 (with Paul Jenkins).  Running Into War. (forthcoming)
Hanley, Lynne. Writing War: Fiction, Gender & Memory.  Amherst: University of Massachusetts Press, 1991.

Notes

External links
Official Website

1943 births
Living people
American feminist writers
Feminist theory
American literary critics
Women literary critics
Cornell University alumni
Columbia University alumni
Hampshire College faculty
Mount Holyoke College faculty
University of California, Berkeley alumni
Virginia Woolf
20th-century British women writers
American women critics